The 1910 Detroit College Tigers football team  was an American football team that represented Detroit College (later renamed the University of Detroit) as an independent during the 1910 college football season. In its third and final season under head coach George A. Kelly, the team compiled a 3–2 record, but was outscored by its opponents by a combined total of 67 to 38.   End Herman J. Keller was the team captain.

The team opened the season with back-to-back losses Michigan Agricultural College (later renamed Michigan State University) and Olivet College, and ended the season with three victories over Hillsdale College, Adrian College, and Michigan State Normal School (later renamed Eastern Michigan University).

At a banquet for the football team held on December 12, coach George Kelly announced that he would not serve as the school's football coach in 1911.

Schedule

Players
The following 13 players received varsity letters for their efforts on the 1910 Detroit College football team:
 Carney
 D'Haene
 Fitzgerald
 Flattery
 Greening
 Haigh
 Harbrecht
 Herman J. Keller, end and captain
 Kelly
 Martz
 McNamara
 Wilkinson
 Yockey

References

Detroit College Tigers
Detroit Titans football seasons
Detroit College Tigers football
Detroit College Tigers football